Sara Carnicelli (born 31 October 1994) is an Italian middle and long-distance runner, competing for the Vatican City.

Career
Carnicelli started competing in 2010 as a youth athlete.

In 2022, Carnicelli competed for the Vatican City, alongside her compatriot Emiliano Morbidelli, at the 2022 Championships of the Small States of Europe in the women's 5000 m. She finished third but she was awarded with an honorary bronze medal as she only participated in a "non-scoring" manner. She then participated at the Mediterranean Games once again competing in a "non-scoring" manner. She would've finished in ninth place if she competed in a "scoring" manner.

Competition record

Notes
 Honorary medal.
 Non-scoring manner, not official ranking.

References

External links
 

Living people
1994 births
Italian female long-distance runners
Italian female middle-distance runners
Italian female steeplechase runners
Sport in Vatican City
20th-century Italian people
21st-century Italian people